Kulan (Qūlan), named Lugovoe (Russian: Луговое) until 1992, is a small town that is the administrative centre of the Turar Ryskulov District of the Jambyl Region of Kazakhstan.

The train station in Kulan is located along the route that connects Taraz, Bishkek and Shu.

On 23 May 2003, Kulan was at the epicentre of an earthquake that was estimated at 6.5–7.0 on the Richter scale.

Famous Ukrainian boxers Wadimir Klitschko and Vitali Klitschko lived and studied at a school in Kulan as they were kids.

Gallery

References

Populated places in Jambyl Region